The Xifeng oil field is an oil field located in Inner Mongolia. It was discovered in 2002 and developed by China National Petroleum Corporation. It began production in 2006 and produces oil.

References

Oil fields in China